Star Maps is the second studio album by American alternative rock band Possum Dixon. It was released in 1996 on Interscope Records.

Critical reception
Trouser Press called the album a "more mature effort [that] lacks some of its predecessor’s raw energy," writing that "though the stylistic expansion is admirable, Possum Dixon can’t disguise the fact that its basic strength remains stripped-down art-punk." The Houston Press wrote that the album "tears down the Southern California myth with a finality reminiscent of L.A.-bashing works such as X's Los Angeles and the Eagles' Hotel California -- though in a context and style more akin to the tense intellect of the Velvet Underground and early Talking Heads." The Chicago Tribune wrote that the band "garnishes its unassuming rockers with vibes, electric piano and mellotron to generate some unfashionably fun, tuneful bashing."

Spin included the album on its list of "The 10 Best Albums You Didn't Hear in '96," its annual review of relatively below-the-radar releases.

Track listing
 "Go West" (Zabrecky) - 3:04
 "In Her Disco" (Zabrecky) - 2:43
 "Radio Comets" (Zabrecky, O'Sullivan, Chavez) - 4:19
 "Party Tonight" (Zabrecky) - 3:52
 "Emergency's About to End" (Zabrecky) - 2:36
 "General Electric" (Zabrecky, O'Sullivan) - 2:39
 "Crashing Your Planet" (Zabrecky) - 3:01
 "Personals" (Zabrecky) - 4:40
 "Reds" (Zabrecky) - 2:07
 "Skid Marks" (Zabrecky, O'Sullivan) - 2:18
 "Artificial Sunlight" (Zabrecky, O'Sullivan, Chavez) - 3:15
 "Apartment Song" (Zabrecky, O'Sullivan, Chavez) - 7:51

Personnel
Possum Dixon
Rob Zabrecky
Robert O'Sullivan
Celso Chavez
with:
Byron Reynolds - drums
Rich Treuel - drums
Josh Freese - drums
"Sneaky" Peter Tomlinson - additional percussion

References

Possum Dixon albums
1996 albums
Interscope Records albums